

The Tannler–Armstrong House is a historic residence in Portland, Oregon, United States. It is a well-preserved and locally distinct example of the English Cottage style. Built in 1924, it was designed during a period when the style was very popular for new homes in Northeast Portland. Between 1920 and 1935, over fifty homes were built in this style in the Northeast quadrant. The house exhibits many of the defining characteristics of the English Cottage style, including rolled eaves to imitate a thatched roof, eyebrow dormers, intersecting roof lines, stucco walls, narrow, paired windows, and arched doorways.

The house was entered on the National Register of Historic Places in 2002.

Notes

See also
National Register of Historic Places listings in Northeast Portland, Oregon

References

External links

Oregon Historic Sites Database entry

Houses completed in 1924
1924 establishments in Oregon
Houses on the National Register of Historic Places in Portland, Oregon
Beaumont-Wilshire, Portland, Oregon
Portland Historic Landmarks